The Rand School of Social Science was formed in 1906 in New York City by adherents of the Socialist Party of America. The school aimed to provide a broad education to workers, imparting a politicizing class-consciousness, and additionally served as a research bureau, a publisher, and the operator of a summer camp for socialist and trade union activists.

The school changed its name to the "Tamiment Institute and Library" in 1935 and it was closely linked to the Social Democratic Federation after the 1936 split of the Socialist Party. Its collection became a key component of today's Tamiment Library and Robert F. Wagner Archives at New York University in 1963.

Institutional history

Forerunners

The idea of establishing new schools for the promotion of socialist ideas in the United States emerged at the end of the 19th century, when a group of Christian socialists organized as the Social Reform Union established the College of Social Science — a correspondence school — in the city of Boston in 1899. Another similarly short-lived institution called the "Karl Marx School" was established in that same city at around that same time. Neither managed to leave much of a mark upon the historical record.

A more successful effort at worker education was made in England with the establishment of Ruskin College in Oxford, England, also in 1899. Three Americans were instrumental in the formation of this entity, Mr. and Mrs. Walter Vrooman and Charles A. Beard, the latter a young graduate student at Oxford University. The trio soon returned to America, where they continued their interest and activity in adult worker education, although none of the three were directly responsible for the establishment of the Rand School.

Shortly after the establishment of the Socialist Party of America in August 1901 an effort was made to establish an institution called the Workmen's Educational League in New York City. This was soon renamed the Socialist Educational League, but the change of moniker did nothing to aid the school's survival and it, too, soon passed from the scene without leaving more than the faintest trace in the contemporary socialist press.

A more serious and official effort at establishing a New York socialist training school came late in 1904, when the City Central Committee of Local Greater New York announced that between the first of the year and May 30, 1905 a socialist school would be established "especially for the instruction of speakers." 

Established through the initiative of party founders Morris Hillquit and Henry L. Slobodin, party newspaper editor Algernon Lee, and ex-Haverhill, Massachusetts mayor John C. Chase, the training school conducted evening courses in history, economics, and philosophy over a 21-week period, offering lectures one night per week. Secretary of this "Board of Instructors" was prominent socialist writer John Spargo, who used his home in Yonkers as the corresponding office for this 1905 effort.

Formation

The idea of a permanent socialist school in New York City, which took form as the Rand School of Social Science, began with the Christian socialist minister, George D. Herron, and his mother-in-law and financial patron, the widowed lumber heiress Caroline (Carrie) A. Rand. After marrying Mrs. Rand's daughter (also named Carrie) in 1901 — regarded as scandalous owing to his divorce and abandonment of his first wife and family — the Herrons moved to New York City, where George became a prominent figure in the fledgling Socialist Party.

The school was established in 1906, made possible by a $200,000 endowment by Mrs. Rand at the time of her sudden death in 1905. The fund was administered by Rand's daughter, Carrie Rand Herron, and Morris Hillquit. A total of about 250 students were enrolled for courses during the school's first year.

In a letter to Morris Hillquit, Herron harmonized the use of the Rand fortune to finance the New York socialist school with the thinking of the elder Carrie Rand back in Iowa in the 1890s:       Mrs. Rand originally had under consideration the establishment of school of Social Science in connection with Iowa College. But when she became aware that it would be impossible to establish such foundation, especially following my enforced resignation, she gave up the thought of what she had in mind at Iowa College ... The school is, in fact, some such thing as Mrs. Herron and I had planned and talked about for many years, and to which I expected at the time, to give my own life personally, as a teacher and organizer of the same.       Operations of the Rand School were governed by an entity called  the American Socialist Society, which included as board members Algernon Lee, Job Harriman, Benjamin Hanford, William Mailly, Leonard D. Abbott, and Henry Slobodin. Formal direction of the school was conducted by a Secretary, originally author and publicist W. J. Ghent.

Ghent was succeeded late in 1909 by Algernon Lee. A reorganization in about 1911 replaced the position of Secretary with an Education Director and an Executive Secretary, both responsible to the Board of Directors. Lee was retained in the former role, while Cornell University graduate Bertha Howell Mailly was employed in the latter position.

Development

In its early years, the school conducted regular lectures and night courses. The first location of the school was at 112 East 19th Street — a one family house converted to use as a school. To help reduce overhead costs some of the rooms of this dwelling were rented out to tenants. The school remained in this brownstone for six years, before losing the lease and being forced to move to a similar building down the block at 140 East 19th Street in 1912.

Beginning in 1911–12, the Rand School implemented a full-time training course, in which students devoted themselves to the study of history, economics, public speaking, and socialist theory without interruption for a period of six months. During the first four years of the existence of the full-time course, 38 men and 8 women completed the program, with 15 others withdrawing before graduation.

The Rand School maintained a close relationship not only with the Socialist Party of America proper, but also with the Intercollegiate Socialist Society and such trade unions as the Amalgamated Clothing Workers Union and the International Ladies' Garment Workers' Union. The school's Labor Research Department declared:

"The school had a very definite object — that of providing an auxiliary or specialized agency to serve the Socialist and Trade Union Movement of the United States in an educational capacity — to offer to the outside public an opportunity for studying the principles, purposes, and methods of this movement; and to offer to the adherents of the movement instruction and training along the lines calculated to make them more efficient workers for the Cause."

Starting in 1913, the Rand School established a Correspondence Department, conducting coursework by mail with socialists and sympathetic unionists around the country. Some 5,000 people took courses by mail from the Rand School by 1916. In addition to classes and public lectures, the Rand School also maintained a reading library.

Instructors and occasional lecturers at the school included Algernon Lee, Scott Nearing, Morris Hillquit, Charles A. Beard, John Spargo, Lucien Sanial, James Maurer, David P. Berenberg, Anna A. Maley, and August Claessens.

In the fall of 1917, with the assistance of a significant financial gift from international gem merchant A.A. Heller, the Rand School moved into a new headquarters facility located a 7 East 15th Street in Manhattan's Union Square neighborhood — a building which it purchased from the YWCA. The new "People's House," as it was called, was a six-storey rectangular building about 75 feet wide by 100 feet long. The lease was formally held by the Society of the Commonwealth Center, which sublet all of the 2nd and 3rd floors, as well as parts of the 1st, 4th, 5th, and 6th floors to the school.

A restaurant and a bookstore said to be the largest radical bookstore in New York City were closely affiliated with the project, with proceeds from each churned back into the school to help offset its expenses. In 1918 the bookstore did more than $50,000 in gross sales, thereby generating a profit for the school of about $10,000. The size and success of the bookstore allowed the school to enter the market as a publisher of political books and pamphlets, launching a labor almanac called the American Labor Year Book in 1916 and publishing material by Morris Hillquit, Scott Nearing, Louis Waldman, Harry W. Laidler, Albert Rhys Williams, and N. Lenin among others.

The school also sought to expand participation through the opening extension offices in the Bronx and Brownsville as well as across the Hudson River in Newark, New Jersey during this period.

The Rand School's annual operating budget for the 1918-19 academic year was approximately $45,000, of which tuition and fees covered about half. Business operations, donations, and the small and diminishing legacy of Carrie Rand covered the rest of the deficit, which was further minimized by comparatively low rates of compensation for teachers and staff.

Beyond its general educational purposes, the Rand School was envisioned as a mechanism for the training of dedicated cadres for the Socialist and trade union movements. An article in the Socialist New York Call likened the school to a "sociological seminary" in which "men and women prepare themselves to be evangelists of a new faith" in which they would go forth "not to fat parishes and prosperous careers, but to hardship, maybe to martyrdom." As such, the school drew close scrutiny during the years of World War I as part of government efforts to suppress opposition to the European war effort.

American participation in World War I did not dampen the level of participation in the Rand School. The institution saw a record enrollment of about 4,000 students for one or more classes in the 1918 academic year and an additional gain of up to 50% was projected by Executive Secretary Bertha Mailly for 1919-20. Of these all but 30 were part-time students, with an additional 70 taking a full complement of courses spread out over a longer period, attending classes only 2 or 3 nights a week.

Mob attacks

Following the end of hostilities in Europe on November 7, 1918, the Rand School was the target of a series of four mob attacks involving demobilized soldiers. The first such incident came on November 25, 1918, during which a Canadian soldier led an organized group of his uniformed fellows in an effort to gain control of the building. Windows in the building were broken in the assault, which followed a mass rally at Madison Square Garden calling for the freedom of radical California labor leader Tom Mooney. The violent raiders were ultimately halted and dispersed by police reserves.

Two more lesser incidents followed, neither of which gained sufficient critical mass to seriously threaten the building and its occupants.

The fourth and final mob incident, and one of the most serious, occurred on May Day 1919. Several hundred demobilized soldiers, many of whom were in uniform, attacked a series of Socialist Party and Industrial Workers of the World headquarters buildings in New York City, including among their targets the Rand School. Doors to the building were locked against them, but raiders ascended the fire escapes outside and entered the 2nd floor Rand School library through the windows. Those who had gained entrance were dissuaded from violence by those inside the building and they peacefully exited without further incident.

Lusk Committee raid and prosecution

On June 21, 1919, mob action was replaced by a legal raid on the Rand School premises, in which representatives of New York's Lusk Committee, appointed by the state legislature to investigate radicalism in the state, obtained a search warrant that was served by 10 members of the state constabulary, assisted by 55 former members of the American Protective League. A large number of books, papers, and documents were removed by the raiders — material which served to further the course of the Lusk Committee's investigation. Two days later, police officials returned and drilled open the safe belonging to the Commonwealth Center, Inc., owners of the Rand School building, and removed additional documents contained therein.

The Rand School was prosecuted for alleged violation of the Espionage Act for publishing the radical anti-militarist pamphlet, "The Great Madness," written by Scott Nearing. In a sensational trial, conducted in 1919 after conclusion of the war itself, Nearing was acquitted of the charges against him, but the Rand School was found guilty for having distributed Nearing's work and was fined $3,000.

The Rand School was also raided in the summer of 1919 by the New York State Legislature's Lusk Committee, searching for evidence of connection to the Communist Party of America. No prosecution followed from this raid although records were seized providing the names of students through the years.

Post-war development
In 1921, individuals close to the Rand School opened a summer school in the Pocono Mountains of Pennsylvania called "Camp Tamiment." The summer camp idea, pioneered by the Fabian socialist movement in Great Britain, allowed socialists and trade unionists the opportunity to escape the summer heat in the city and to attend courses with their fellows in a pastoral setting. Among those teaching classes at Camp Tamiment over the years were Norman Thomas, Jessie Wallace Hughan, and Stuart Chase.

By 1924, the Rand School boasted a library with over 6,000 bound volumes, as well as a wide array of pamphlets, magazines, and newspapers. The school was responsible for the publication of an annual almanac of the labor movement entitled The American Labor Year Book and was instrumental in the establishment of the Labor Education Council, together with the Furrier's Union, the Amalgamated Knit Goods Workers, and other unions centered in New York.

In 1935, the Rand School changed its name to the "Tamiment Institute and Library," although it continued to use the imprint "Rand School Press" for its printed publications.

The Rand School after the 1936 split

During the Socialist Party split of 1936, the Rand School of Social Science followed the Old Guard faction out of the party and into the new Social Democratic Federation. During this final interval the school was supported by an increasing percentage of the profits generated by Camp Tamiment, the SDF's country summer camp for trade union workers. by the late 1930s more than half of the Rand School's operating expenses were generated from the proceeds of Camp Tamiment, rising to more than 75% during the last years of the school's existence. Indeed, as one historian of the Rand School has noted, "the School's continued existence was possible only as long as the Camp continued to pay the bills.:

Termination and legacy

In 1956, the economically failing school was purchased by the operators of Camp Tamiment, who formally terminated its educational operations while continuing to maintain its library, renamed after the camp's managing director, Ben Josephson. This status ended in 1963, when the Josephson Library was made a part of the special collections library at New York University, known today as the Tamiment Library and Robert F. Wagner Archives.

Teachers

Instructors and lecturers (1915–1916)

The pamphlet The Rise and Decline of Christian Civilization by Scott Nearing includes mention of "Instructors and Lecturers. 1915–1916":

 Samuel E. Beardsley
 Louis B. Boudin 
 August Claessens
 Morris Hillquit 
 Scott Nearing
 Juliet Stuart Poyntz
 I. M. Rubinow
 James T. Shotwell 
 John Spargo
 N. I. Stone

Noted lecturer and teachers (1919)

The Case for the Rand School (July 26, 1919) lists the following "noted lecturers and teachers":
 From the United States House of Representatives:
 Meyer London (New York 12th district: Socialist) 
 New York  Municipal Court:
 Judge Jacob Panken
 New York Assembly:
 August Claessens, member
 Abraham I. Shiplacoff, member
 From the New York Board of Aldermen:
 B. C. Vladeck, member
 From the Pennsylvania State Federation of Labor:
 James H. Maurer, President 
 From Columbia University:
 Charles A. Beard, historian ... now of the Bureau of Municipal Research 
 Franklin H. Giddings
 Alexander Goldenweiser
 Benjamin B. Kendrick
 William P. Montague
 David Saville Muzzey
 James Harvey Robinson
 E. M. Sait
 James T. Shotwell 
 Harry W. L. Dana
 Dorothy Brewster of the Teachers' College
 George R. Kirkpatrick of Albion College
 From Brown University:
 Lester F. Ward, sociologist
 From Stanford University:
 David Starr Jordan, biologist
 From New York University
 Willard C. Fisher, economist
 From Wellesley College:
 Ellen Hayes
 Vida D. Scudder
 From Chicago University:
 Charles Zueblin, lecturer and writer on municipal affairs
 From Barnard College:
  Juliet Stuart Poyntz 
 From Princeton University:
 Evans Clark, specialist in municipal affairs
 From Dartmouth College:
 Dr. G. B. L. Arner, statistician
 From the American Museum of Natural History:
 Dr. Robert Lowie, anthropologist
 From the New York School of Philanthropy:
 John Fitch, industrial expert
 From the Rockefeller Institute:
 Dr. Phoebus A. Levene, physiological chemists
 From the Joint Board of Sanitary Control in the Garment Industry:
 Dr. George M. Price, authority on industrial hygiene
 From the United States Commissioner of Immigration:
 Dr. Frederic C. Howe, authority on municipal affairs
 Illinois State Federation of Labor: 
 Duncan McDonald, President
 Women's Trade Union League: 
 Alice Henry
 From the Amalgamated Clothing Workers of America:
 Joseph Schlossberg, General Secretary
 From the International Association of Machinists:
 James H. Duncan
 From the International Jewelry Workers' Union:
 Samuel E. Beardsley
 From the National Consumers' League:
 Florence Kelley 
  From the National Child Labor Committee:
 Owen R. Lovejoy
 From the British Steel Workers' Union:
 John Jones
 From the British Women's Trade Union League:
 Mary Macarthur
 From the United States Children's Bureau:
 Helen L. Sumner (formerly of the American Association for Labor Legislation)
 From the Brooklyn Ethical Culture Society:
 Dr. Henry Neumann 
 From the Cooperative League of America:
 Dr. James P. Warbasse, President* From the Belgian Senate:
 Henri La Fontaine, member 
 Others:
 Dr. I. M. Rubinow, statistician and authority on Social Insurance
 Dr. N. I. Stone, statistician and authority on tariffs and wage-rates
 Dr. I. A. Hourwich, statistician and authority on immigration and on Russian economic conditions
 Dr. Alexander Fichandler
 Dr. B. C. Gruenberg
 Jessie Wallace Hughan
 Miss Alma Kriger
 Dr. Gabriel R. Mason
 Max Schonberg
 Walter N. Polakov, prominent consulting engineer
 Dr. John Dillon, formerly New York State Commissioner of Food and Markets
 Morris Hillquit, lawyer, publicist, and authority on scientific Socialism 
 Dr. W. E. B. DuBois, writer and lecturer on Negro affairs
 Lajpat Rai, Indian educator and publicist
 Francis Sheehy-Skeffington, Irish publicist and historian
 William Butler Yeats, Irish litterateur 
 Padraic Colum, Irish litterateur
 Louis B. Boudin, lawyer and writer on scientific Socialism 
 John Spargo, writer and lecturer on scientific Socialism
 Rev. John Haynes Holmes of the Church of the Messiah
 Oswald Garrison Villard, publisher of The Nation
 Robert Ferrari, lawyer and criminologist
 Robert W. Bruere, writer on labor questions
 Jack London, novelist 
 John D. Barry
 Max Eastman 
 Charlotte Perkins Oilman
 Muriel Hope
 Fola La Follette
 John Ward Stimson
 Marion Craig Wentworth
 Eugene Wood 
 Herman Epstein, composer and musical critic
 Eugene Schoen, architect and lecturer on art
 Mme. Aino Malmberg, authority on Finnish Affairs

Disambiguation
The Rand School is not related to the: 
 New School for Social Research, a separate and unaffiliated institution of higher learning also located in New York City 
 RAND Corporation, a non-profit global-policy think tank

See also

 Rose Gollup Cohen
 George D. Herron
 Camp Tamiment
 Workers Defense Union
 Work People's College (1907)
 Brookwood Labor College (1921)
 New York Workers School (1923):
 New Workers School (1929) 
 Jefferson School of Social Science (1944)
 Highlander Research and Education Center (formerly Highlander Folk School) (1932)
 Commonwealth College (Arkansas) (1923-1940) 
 Southern Appalachian Labor School (since 1977)
 San Francisco Workers' School (1934)
 California Labor School (formerly Tom Mooney Labor School) (1942)
 Continuing education
 Los Angeles People's Education Center

References

Further reading
 Frederic Cornell, A History of the Rand School of Social Science, 1906 to 1956. PhD dissertation. Columbia University Teachers College, 1976.
 Eugene V. Debs, "The Vision of the People's House," New York Call, vol. 10, no. 245 (Sept. 2, 1917), pg. 8.
 Rachel Cutler Schwartz, The Rand School of Social Science, 1906-1924: A Study of Worker Education in the Socialist Era. PhD dissertation. State University of New York at Buffalo, 1984.
 Dorothy Swanson, "The Tamiment Institute/Ben Josephson Library and the Robert F. Wagner Labor Archives at New York University," Library Quarterly, vol. 59, no. 2 (April 1989), pp. 148–161. In JSTOR
 Thomas Wirth, A Beautiful Public Life: George D. Herron, American Socialism, and Radical Political Culture at the Rand School of Social Science, 1890-1956. PhD dissertation. Binghamton University, 2014.

External links
 "The Tamiment Library", by Andrew H. Lee, Autumn 2004, London Socialist Historians Group.
"History and Description", The Taminent Library and Robert F. Wagner Labor Archives
Guide to the Rand School of Social Science Records 1905-1962 Taminent Library

Socialist Party of America
Labor schools
Socialism in New York (state)
1906 establishments in New York City
Educational institutions established in 1906
1935 disestablishments in New York (state)
Educational institutions disestablished in 1935